Split hand split foot-nystagmus syndrome, also known as Karsch-Neugebauer syndrome is a rare genetic disorder which is characterized by the absence of the central rays of the hands and foot resulting in an apparent "split hand and split foot", alongside congenital nystagmus and other eye abnormalities such as cataracts. It is inherited in an autosomal dominant manner. Only 10 cases from 4 families worldwide have been described in medical literature.

References 

Autosomal dominant disorders
Rare genetic syndromes
Syndromes affecting the eye